NRBQ is an American rock band founded by Terry Adams (piano), Steve Ferguson (guitar) and Joey Spampinato (bass). Originally the "New Rhythm and Blues Quintet", the group was formed around 1965. Adams disbanded it for a time, and the group re-formed in 1967. Today's quartet is known for its live performances, containing a high degree of spontaneity and levity, and blending rock, pop, jazz, blues and Tin Pan Alley styles. Its current membership comprises the quartet of pianist Adams, bassist Casey McDonough, guitarist Scott Ligon, and drummer John Perrin. Some of the more notable members in the band's long history are singer, writer and bassist Joey Spampinato, guitarists Al Anderson and Johnny Spampinato; drummers Tom Staley and Tom Ardolino; and vocalist Frank Gadler.

History
NRBQ began in late 1965 as a rehearsal band in the Shively, Kentucky home of brothers Terry and Donn Adams, and they appeared on stage for the first time in 1966.  Along with drummer Charlie Craig, they made home tapes of their experiments.  The first known reference to the band's name can be heard on one of these home tapes, with Donn announcing, "Here they are, the New Rhythm and Blues Quintet!" as though presenting them to a live audience.

In late spring of 1966, guitarist Steve Ferguson was invited to join NRBQ after he quit Mersey-Beats USA (no relation to the Liverpool group who recorded "I Stand Accused"). He met Adams when the latter briefly joined Mersey-Beats USA to fill in for the regular keyboard player. After playing a few live dates in Louisville, Jimmy Orten (Soul Inc) was recruited on bass and vocals and the band left for Florida in late 1966.

In Miami, early January 1967, NRBQ played six nights at The Cheetah. Soon after, Orten and Ferguson returned to Louisville. Adams stayed behind and joined The Seven of Us, a band that was playing the same club. By August, the NRBQ was Adams (keyboards), Ferguson (guitar), Spampinato (bass) and Frank Gadler (vocals) from The Seven of Us, and Tom Staley (drums).

In December 1968, they began recording with Eddie Kramer at the Record Plant and by early 1969 were signed to a two-record deal with Columbia Records.  Their self-titled debut album was released that year, with songs by both Eddie Cochran and Sun Ra, and a number of similarly wide-ranging original songs.  The following year, the group collaborated with rockabilly legend Carl Perkins on an album titled Boppin' the Blues.

Over the next three years, the band experienced personnel shifts, with the departure of Ferguson (replaced for one year by Ken Sheehan), Gadler, and Staley, and the arrival of two new members: guitarist/singer Al Anderson formerly of The Wildweeds, known for the Connecticut and Massachusetts regional hit "No Good To Cry", and drummer Tom Ardolino. The Adams/Spampinato/Anderson/Ardolino quartet stayed together longer than any other incarnation of the band (20 years, from 1974 until 1994), and was often augmented by the Whole Wheat Horns (Donn Adams, Keith Spring and others).

Starting in September 1989, NRBQ opened for R.E.M. on the "Acronym Tour" with the first concert taking place on the 27th at the University of Dayton Arena. The last stop on the tour was at the Shoreline Amphitheater at Mountain View in Mountain View, California on October 21. Rolling Stones Sam Freedman noted that the NRBQ played a compressed 30-minute club show. He also reported that both Mike Mills and Peter Buck of R.E.M. watched each of the NRBQ's opening sets during their portion of the tour from the edge of the stage "as if to endorse NRBQ for their fans".

In 1994 Anderson departed the group: he would become an award-winning Nashville  songwriter for many country and western acts. He was replaced in NRBQ by Joey Spampinato's younger brother, Johnny Spampinato, who was (and still is) a member of power-pop band The Incredible Casuals.

On April 30 and May 1, 2004, the group celebrated its 35th anniversary with concerts at the Calvin Theater in Northampton, Massachusetts. The shows featured every former and current member of the band, as Ferguson, Gadler, Staley, Sheehan and Anderson came back for a NRBQ reunion.

Hiatus and return

After the Halloween engagement at Shank Hall in Milwaukee in 2004, NRBQ went on hiatus. Adams had developed stage 4 throat cancer. During this time, Ardolino and the Spampinato brothers started playing shows as a trio, under the name "Baby Macaroni" and as the "Spaminato Bros.".  After a number of months, Adams recovered well enough to tour with former drummer Staley and Japanese rockabilly group the Hot Shots.

In June 2006, Adams and Ferguson released the album Louisville Sluggers (with Ardolino on drums, Pete Toigo on bass and other supporting musicians), and this album's line-up performed some live shows in the U.S. and Japan as "The Terry Adams – Steve Ferguson Quartet" and "Rock & Roll Summit Meeting."

Also in September 2006 came the release of a SpongeBob SquarePants album, The Best Day Ever, which included backing music by all four NRBQ members, as well as Anderson. The album, a collection of '60s-influenced pop/rock produced by Andy Paley, and co-written by Paley and the voice of SpongeBob, Tom Kenny, also included such musical luminaries as Brian Wilson, Tommy Ramone, James Burton, Flaco Jiménez and Philadelphia DJ Jerry "The Geator" Blavat.

In November 2007, Adams formed "The Terry Adams Rock & Roll Quartet" with Scott Ligon on guitar and vocals, Pete Donnelly (of The Figgs) on bass and Conrad Choucroun and Ardolino on drums.

In March 2011, Adams posted an open letter to fans announcing that with the release of the upcoming album, Keep This Love Goin''', this line-up would take on the NRBQ name. He also explained that while he did have tendonitis, the real reason for the hiatus was his treatment for cancer. In May 2012, the group released a live album, We Travel the Spaceways, on Clang! records.

During September 2012, bassist Donnelly was replaced by Scott Ligon's friend Casey McDonough.  (As of 2021, Ligon and McDonough are also members of the Flat Five, based in Chicago.)

In July 2013, NRBQ toured with drummer Joe Camarillo of The Waco Brothers and Hushdrops, where he recorded two songs on the Brass Tacks album: "Greetings from Delaware" and "I'm Not Here".  Bobby Lloyd Hicks became the drummer from 2013 to 2015. He played on "Love In Outer Space" and "Let Go" from the 5 CD box set High Noon.  John Perrin became the drummer in 2015.

Steve Ferguson died of cancer on October 7, 2009.

Tom Ardolino died on January 6, 2012, following a long illness.

Bobby Lloyd Hicks died of bronchiectasis on February 20, 2017.

Joe Camarillo died on January 24, 2021, of a stroke after contracting COVID-19.<ref
name=JCamarillo-death_CReader>
</ref>

Reunion shows
On April 27 and 28 of 2007, NRBQ gave a pair of "38th Anniversary" performances in Northampton, Massachusetts, the first public NRBQ shows since 2004. Both Anderson and Johnny Spampinato appeared in the line-up, along with "Whole Wheat Horns" Donn Adams and Jim Bob Hoke, and unannounced guest appearances by John Sebastian, original NRBQ drummer Staley and the band's former road manager  Klem Klimek on saxophone. Gadler, former lead vocalist, also appeared.

Style and influence
The band's music is a blend of styles from rockabilly to Beatles-influenced pop to Thelonious Monk-inspired jazz. They have attracted fans as diverse as Bob Dylan, Paul McCartney, Elvis Costello, Keith Richards, The Replacements, John Sebastian, Dave Edmunds, Ira Kaplan and Penn & Teller. NRBQ songs have been performed by Bonnie Raitt, Los Lobos, and Dave Edmunds among others. Also, the group served as the unofficial "house band" for The Simpsons for the season 10–12 period in which NRBQ fan Mike Scully was head writer and executive producer. NRBQ allowed several of their songs to be used on The Simpsons, including "Mayonnaise and Marmalade", written specifically for the show. The band also appeared in animated form and on camera during the end credits to perform the show's theme song during the episode "Take My Wife, Sleaze" and to perform Edmunds's cover of "Me & The Boys". The band also recorded a song entitled "Birdman" for an episode of Space Ghost Coast to Coast entitled "Pilot". The group appeared in feature films, including Day of the Dead, Shakes the Clown, and 28 Days. Their cover version of "Down in My Heart" appeared in the series finale of Wilfred.

NRBQ has a following from years of live shows. The band has been known to perform without a set list which makes the band, in the words of AllMusic's Mark Deming, "a stellar and wildly unpredictable live act." In addition to its own compositions, the band performs a broad range of cover material and audience requests.

In their nearly 50-year history, NRBQ's records have been released by many record companies, including Columbia Records, Kama Sutra Records, Mercury Records, Virgin Records, Rhino Entertainment, Rounder Records, and more. Their song "Get That Gasoline Blues" (on Kama Sutra) reached No. 70 in 1974 on the Billboard Hot 100 chart. Over the years, the group played sets while wearing pajamas, hired professional wrestler "Captain" Lou Albano as its manager (for whom they penned a song in tribute), and exploded Cabbage Patch Dolls on stage.

Members
Current line-up
Terry Adams – keyboards, vocals (1966–present), occasional live drums (1974–2004)
Scott Ligon – guitar, vocals (2011–present)
Casey McDonough – bass, vocals (2012–present)
John Perrin – drums (2015–present)

Former members
Steve Ferguson – guitar, vocals (1966–1970, 1973–1974 died 2009)
Joey Spampinato – bass, vocals (1967–2004)
Tom Staley – drums (1967–1974)
Frank Gadler – lead vocals (1967–1972)
Joe Gallivan – drums (1968)
Ken Sheehan – guitar (1970)
Al Anderson – guitar, vocals (1971–1993)
Tom Ardolino – drums, vocals (1974–2004, died 2012)
Johnny Spampinato – guitar, vocals (1994–2004)
Conrad Choucroun – drums (2011–2013)
Pete Donnelly – bass, vocals (2011–2012)
Joe Camarillo – drums (2013, died 2021)
Bobby Lloyd Hicks – drums (2013–2015, died 2017)

Timeline

Discography

Studio albumsNRBQ (Columbia) 1969 No. 162 US; rereleased (Omnivore) 2018Boppin' the Blues (w/ Carl Perkins) (Columbia) 1970Scraps (Kama Sutra) 1972Workshop (Kama Sutra) 1973All Hopped Up (Red Rooster) 1977; rereleased (Omnivore) 2018At Yankee Stadium (Mercury) 1978Kick Me Hard (Rounder/Red Rooster) 1979Tiddly Winks (Rounder/Red Rooster) 1980Grooves in Orbit (Bearsville) 1983Tapdancin' Bats (Rounder/Red Rooster) 1983She Sings, They Play (w/ Skeeter Davis) (Rounder/Red Rooster) 1985Lou and the Q (w/ "Captain" Lou Albano) (Rounder/Red Rooster) 1986Wild Weekend (Virgin) 1989 No. 198 USMessage for the Mess Age (Rhino) 1994You're Nice People You Are (Rounder) 1997Christmas Wish (Rounder) 1997NRBQ (sometimes known as "The Yellow Album") (Rounder) 1999Atsa My Band (Edisun) 2002Dummy (Edisun) 2004Keep This Love Goin (Clang!) 2011Brass Tacks (Clang!) 2014Happy Talk [5 song EP] (Omnivore) 2017April Showers [3 song EP] (Omnivore) 2018Dragnet (Omnivore) 2021

Live albumsGod Bless Us All (Rounder) 1987Diggin' Uncle Q (Rounder) 1988Honest Dollar (Rykodisc) 1992Tokyo (Rounder) 1996You Gotta Be Loose (Rounder) 1998Live from Mountain Stage (Live performances from the Mountain Stage radio show) (Blue Plate) 2002Live at the Wax Museum (previously unreleased concert from 1982, with guest John Sebastian) (Edisun) 2003Froggy's Favorites Vol. 1 (compilation of unreleased live tracks 1979—1999) (Edisun) 2006Ludlow Garage 1970 (previously unreleased concert from 1970) (Sundazed) 2006We Travel the Spaceways (Clang!) 2012Talk Thelonious (Euclid Records) 2015Turn On, Tune In (Omnivore) 2019NRBQ at the Ardmore Music Hall 2015 (arQive) 2020NRBQ & the Whole Wheat Horns Park West 83 (arQive) 2022

CompilationsRC Cola and a Moon Pie (Rounder/Red Rooster) 1986Uncommon Denominators (Rounder-era compilation covering 1972 through 1984) (Rounder) 1987Kick Me Hard — The Deluxe Edition (reissue, w/ 8 bonus tracks) (Rounder) 1989Peek-A-Boo (multi-label compilation covering 1969 through 1989) (Rhino) 1990Stay with We (compilation of Columbia years, w/ unreleased songs) (Columbia/Legacy) 1993Tapdancin' Bats — The Anniversary Edition (reissue, w/ 4 bonus tracks) (Rounder) 1998Ridin' in My Car (reissue of All Hopped Up, w/ unreleased songs) (Rounder) 1999Scraps (reissue, remastered, w/ 3 bonus tracks) (Rounder) 2000Scraps Companion (15 tracks from radio show from Memphis in 1972 and 6 outtakes from Scraps sessions) (Edisun) 2000Transmissions (2-disc Japan-only compilation featuring about 40 percent unissued material) (Caraway) 2004Christmas Wish — Deluxe Version (Clang!) 2007High Noon: A 50-Year Retrospective [106-track 5-CD version] (Omnivore) 2016High Noon: A 50-Year Retrospective [17-track digital version] (Omnivore) 2016High Noon: A 50-Year Retrospective [26-track 2-LP version] (Omnivore) 2017In • Frequencies'' (Omnivore) 2020

Singles
"Stomp / I Didn't Know Myself" (Columbia) 1969 No. 122 US 
"C'mon Everybody / Rocket Number 9" (Columbia) 1969
"Down In My Heart / Sure To Fall (In Love With You)" (Columbia) 1969
"All Mama's Children / Step Aside" (with Carl Perkins) (Columbia) 1970
"Howard Johnson's Got His Ho-Jo Workin' / Only You" (Kama Sutra) 1972
"Magnet / Do You Feel It?" (Kama Sutra) 1972
"C'mon If You're Comin' / RC And A Moon Pie" (Kama Sutra) 1973
"Get That Gasoline Blues / Mona" (Kama Sutra) 1973 No. 70 US 
"Rumors / Sourpuss" (Select-O-Hit) 1974
"Ridin' In My Car / Do The Bump" (Red Rooster) 1977
"I Got A Rocket In My Pocket / Tapdancin' Bats" (Red Rooster) 1977
"I Love Her, She Loves Me / Green Lights" (Mercury) 1978
"Hot Biscuits And Sweet Marie / Don't She Look Good" (Red Rooster/Rounder) 1979
"Get That Gasoline / Wacky Tobacky" (Red Rooster/Rounder) 1979 No. 105 US Cashbox
"Me And The Boys / People" (Red Rooster/Rounder) 1980
"Christmas Wish / Jolly Old St. Nicholas" (Red Rooster/Rounder) 1980
"Never Take The Place Of You / Radio Spot / TV Spot" (Red Rooster/Rounder) 1980
"Captain Lou / Boardin' House Pie" (W/ Captain Lou Albano) (Red Rooster) 1982
"Rain At The Drive-In / Smackaroo" (Instrumental) (Bearsville) 1983
"Wild Weekend / This Love Is True" (Virgin) 1989
"If I Don't Have You" (Virgin) 1989
"A Little Bit Of Bad / Tom Dooley" (Forward) 1994
"Over Your Head / Blues Stay Away From Me / Spampinato" (Forward) 1994
"Careful What You Ask For" (Rounder) 1999
"Everybody Say Yeah! / Hornin' In" (Euclid) 2012
"Never Cop Out / Scram! It's The Fuzz" (B-side By Los Straitjackets) (Spinout) 2016
"Do The Primal Thing" (Extended Version) (Omnivore) 2020
"I'm Not Here / All I Have To Do Is Dream" (Folc) 2021

References

External links
NRBQ Headquarters
NRBQ homepage
Terry Adams homepage
http://www.spampinatobrothers.com/
Al Anderson homepage

American power pop groups
Bearsville Records artists
Columbia Records artists
Kama Sutra Records artists
Mercury Records artists
Musical groups established in 1967
Musical groups from Miami
Musical groups from Louisville, Kentucky
Rounder Records artists